Westend may refer to:

 Westend (Trevilians, Virginia), an historic house in Virginia listed on the NRHP
 Westend (Berlin), a locality of Berlin in Germany
 Westend (Frankfurt am Main), a borough of Frankfurt am Main in Germany
 Westend, Espoo, a borough of Espoo in Finland
 Wiesbaden-Westend, a borough of Wiesbaden in Germany
 Westend (band), an Austrian group that performed in the Eurovision Song Contest 1983

See also 
 West End (disambiguation)
 Westende, a town in Belgium